Earth system science (ESS) is the application of systems science to the Earth. In particular, it considers interactions and 'feedbacks', through material and energy fluxes, between the Earth's sub-systems' cycles, processes and "spheres"—atmosphere, hydrosphere, cryosphere, geosphere, pedosphere, lithosphere, biosphere, and even the magnetosphere—as well as the impact of human societies on these components. At its broadest scale, Earth system science brings together researchers across both the natural and social sciences, from fields including ecology, economics, geography, geology, glaciology, meteorology, oceanography, climatology, paleontology, sociology, and space science. Like the broader subject of systems science, Earth system science assumes a holistic view of the dynamic interaction between the Earth's spheres and their many constituent subsystems fluxes and processes, the resulting spatial organization and time evolution of these systems, and their variability, stability and instability. Subsets of Earth System science include systems geology and systems ecology, and many aspects of Earth System science are fundamental to the subjects of physical geography and climate science.

Definition
The Science Education Resource Center, Carleton College, offers the following description: "Earth System science embraces chemistry, physics, biology, mathematics and applied sciences in transcending disciplinary boundaries to treat the Earth as an integrated system. It seeks a deeper understanding of the physical, chemical, biological and human interactions that determine the past, current and future states of the Earth. Earth System science provides a physical basis for understanding the world in which we live and upon which humankind seeks to achieve sustainability".

Earth System science has articulated four overarching, definitive and critically important features of the Earth System, which include:

 Variability: Many of the Earth System's natural 'modes' and variabilities across space and time are beyond human experience, because of the stability of the recent Holocene. Much Earth System science therefore relies on studies of the Earth's past behaviour and models to anticipate future behaviour in response to pressures. 
 Life: Biological processes play a much stronger role in the functioning and responses of the Earth System than previously thought. It appears to be integral to every part of the Earth System. 
 Connectivity:  Processes are connected in ways and across depths and lateral distances that were previously unknown and inconceivable. 
 Non-linear: The behaviour of the Earth System is typified by strong non-linearities. This means that abrupt change can result when relatively small changes in a 'forcing function' push the System across a 'threshold'.

Origins 
For millennia, humans have speculated how the physical and living elements on the surface of the Earth combine, with gods and goddesses frequently posited to embody specific elements. The notion that the Earth, itself, is alive was a regular theme of Greek philosophy and religion. Early scientific interpretations of the Earth system began in the field of geology, initially in the Middle East and China, and largely focused on aspects such as the age of the Earth and the large-scale processes involved in mountain and ocean formation. As geology developed as a science, understanding of the interplay of different facets of the Earth system increased, leading to the inclusion of factors such as the Earth's interior, planetary geology and living systems.

In many respects, the foundational concepts of Earth System science can be seen in the holistic interpretations of nature promoted by the 19th century geographer Alexander von Humboldt. In the 20th century, Vladimir Vernadsky (1863–1945) saw the functioning of the biosphere as a geological force generating a dynamic disequilibrium, which in turn promoted the diversity of life. In the mid-1960s, James Lovelock first postulated a regulatory role for the biosphere in feedback mechanisms within the Earth system. Initially named the "Earth Feedback hypothesis", Lovelock later renamed it the Gaia hypothesis, and subsequently further developed the theory with American evolutionary theorist Lynn Margulis during the 1970s. In parallel, the field of systems science was developing across numerous other scientific fields, driven in part by the increasing availability and power of computers, and leading to the development of climate models that began to allow the detailed and interacting simulations of the Earth's weather and climate. Subsequent extension of these models has led to the development of "Earth system models" (ESMs) that include facets such as the cryosphere and the biosphere.

As an integrative field, Earth System science assumes the histories of a vast range of scientific disciplines, but as a discrete study it evolved in the 1980s, particularly at NASA, where a committee called the Earth System Science Committee was formed in 1983. The earliest reports of NASA's ESSC, Earth System Science: Overview (1986), and the book-length Earth System Science: A Closer View (1988), constitute a major landmark in the formal development of Earth system science. Early works discussing Earth system science, like these NASA reports, generally emphasized the increasing human impacts on the Earth system as a primary driver for the need of greater integration among the life and geo-sciences, making the origins of Earth system science parallel to the beginnings of global change studies and programs.

Climate science 

Climatology and climate change have been central to Earth System science since its inception, as evidenced by the prominent place given to climate change in the early NASA reports discussed above. The Earth's climate system is a prime example of an emergent property of the whole planetary system, that is, one which cannot be fully understood without regarding it as a single integrated entity. It is also a system where human impacts have been growing rapidly in recent decades, lending immense importance to the successful development and advancement of Earth System science research. As just one example of the centrality of climatology to the field, leading American climatologist Michael E. Mann is the Director of one of the earliest centers for Earth System science research, the Earth System Science Center at Pennsylvania State University, and its mission statement reads, "the Earth System Science Center (ESSC) maintains a mission to describe, model, and understand the Earth's climate system".

Relationship to the Gaia hypothesis

The Gaia hypothesis posits that living systems interact with physical components of the Earth system to form a self-regulating whole that maintains conditions that are favourable for life. Developed initially by James Lovelock, the hypothesis attempts to account for key features of the Earth system, including the long period (several billion years) of relatively favourable climatic conditions against a backdrop of steadily increasing solar radiation. Consequently, the Gaia hypothesis has important implications for Earth system science, as noted by NASA's Director for Planetary Science, James Green, in October 2010: "Dr. Lovelock and Dr. Margulis played a key role in the origins of what we now know as Earth system science".

Although the Gaia hypothesis and Earth system science take an interdisciplinary approach to studying systems operations on a planetary-scale, they are not synonymous with one another. A number of potential Gaian feedback mechanisms have been proposed—such as the CLAW hypothesis—but the hypothesis does not have universal support within the scientific community, though it remains an active research topic.

Education 
Earth System science can be studied at a postgraduate level at some universities, with notable programs at such institutions as the University of California, Irvine, Pennsylvania State University, and Stanford University. In general education, the American Geophysical Union, in cooperation with the Keck Geology Consortium and with support from five divisions within the National Science Foundation, convened a workshop in 1996, "to define common educational goals among all disciplines in the Earth sciences". In its report, participants noted that, "The fields that make up the Earth and space sciences are currently undergoing a major advancement that promotes understanding the Earth as a number of interrelated systems". Recognizing the rise of this systems approach, the workshop report recommended that an Earth System science curriculum be developed with support from the National Science Foundation. In 2000, the Earth System Science Education Alliance was begun, and currently includes the participation of 40+ institutions, with over 3,000 teachers having completed an ESSEA course as of fall 2009".

See also 

 
 
 Earth system governance

References

External links

Earth system science at Nature.com

 
Global natural environment
Complex systems theory